The following article describes in detail the discography of Plumb, which includes all of her studio albums, compilation albums, singles, and rare releases.

Studio albums

EPs

Singles

Compilation albums

Music videos
"Unforgivable" 
"Sobering (Don't Turn Around)"
"Crazy"
"Real"
"Boys Don't Cry"
"Sink N' Swim"
"Cut"
"I Don't Deserve You" (by Paul Van Dyk)
"Drifting"
"One Drop"
"Beautiful"
"Need You Now (How Many Times)"
"Beautifully Broken"
"Somebody Loves You" (by Aly & Fila)

Compilation contributions
Dog Park Soundtrack, 1998 ... "Stranded"
Surfonic Water Revival, 1998 ... "Surfer Girl Replies"
Viva!, 1999 ... "Stranded" Demo
Propska One, 1999 ... "Endure" Remix
Brokedown Palace Soundtrack, 1999 ... "Damaged"
Drive Me Crazy Soundtrack, 1999 ... "Stranded"
WOW 2000, 1999 ... "Stranded"
Unshakeable: Acquire the Fire, 2001 ... "History Maker"
Essential Hits: Ten - Celebrating A Decade of Wonder, 2002 ... "God-Shaped Hole"
View from the Top Soundtrack, 2003 .. "Boys Don't Cry"
Bruce Almighty Soundtrack, 2003 ... "God-Shaped Hole"
Absolute Modern Worship, 2005 ... "All My Tears (Be Washed Away)"
The Perfect Man Soundtrack, 2005 ... "Real Life Fairytale"
Ultimate Music Makeover: The Songs of Michael W. Smith, 2005 ... "Pray For Me"
WOW Hits 2007, 2006 ... "I Can't Do This"
The Nativity Story: Sacred Songs, 2006 ... "Mary Sweet Mary" (with Selah)
Evan Almighty Soundtrack, 2007 ... "Spirit in the Sky"
WOW Hits 2014, 2013 ... "Need You Now (How Many Times)"
WOW Hits 2015, 2014 ... "Don't Deserve You"
WOW Hits 2016, 2015 ... "Lord, I'm Ready Now"
WOW Hits 2017, 2016 ... "Exhale"

Notes

References

Discographies of American artists
Pop music discographies
Christian music discographies